Rhytidophaena is a genus of beetles in the family Cicindelidae, containing the following species:

 Rhytidophaena feae (Gestro, 1889)
 Rhytidophaena inornata (W. Horn, 1900)
 Rhytidophaena tetraspilota (Chaudoir, 1852)

References

Cicindelidae